King of the Road: The Genius of Roger Miller is a compilation album by Roger Miller released in 1995.

70 songs in chronological order from every label (Mercury/Starday, Decca, RCA, Smash, Columbia, and MCA) for which Roger Miller recorded, and two songs from the Tony Award winning Broadway Musical Big River. Including eight unreleased recordings.

Track listing
All tracks composed by Roger Miller; except where indicated

CD-1

CD-2

CD-3

Production
Producer: The Country Music Foundation
Annotated by: Daniel Cooper
Compiled by: Daniel Cooper
Remastered by: Joseph M. Palmaccio

Track notes
CD-1: Recorded
 1–1 April–October 1957; (prob.) Houston, Texas
 1–2 April–October 1957; (prob.) Houston, Texas
 1–3 December 13, 1958; Nashville, Tennessee
 1–4 December 13, 1958; Nashville, Tennessee
 1–5 June 30, 1959; Nashville, Tennessee
 1-6 circa Summer 1960; Nashville, Tennessee (demo, unissued)
 1-7 circa 1960; Nashville, Tennessee (radio transcription, unissued)
 1–8 August 10, 1960; Nashville, Tennessee
 1–9 February 4, 1961; Nashville, Tennessee
 1–10 September 19, 1961; Nashville, Tennessee
 1-11 circa January 1963; Nashville, Tennessee (demo, unissued)
 1–12 February 14, 1963; Nashville, Tennessee
 1–13 January 10, 1964; Nashville, Tennessee
 1–14 January 10, 1964; Nashville, Tennessee (unissued)
 1–15 January 11, 1964; Nashville, Tennessee
 1–16 January 11, 1964; Nashville, Tennessee
 1–17 January 11, 1964; Nashville, Tennessee
 1–18 January 11, 1964; Nashville, Tennessee
 1–19 January 11, 1964; Nashville, Tennessee
 1–20 August 11, 1964; Nashville, Tennessee
 1–21 August 11, 1964; Nashville, Tennessee
 1–22 October 2, 1964; Nashville, Tennessee
 1–23 October 2, 1964; Nashville, Tennessee
 1–24 November 3, 1964; Nashville, Tennessee
CD-2: Recorded
 2–1 November 3, 1964; Nashville, Tennessee
 2–2 November 3, 1964; Nashville, Tennessee
 2–3 November 3, 1964; Nashville, Tennessee
 2–4 February 11, 1965; Nashville, Tennessee
 2–5 February 11, 1965; Nashville, Tennessee
 2–6 February 11, 1965; Nashville, Tennessee
 2–7 April 15, 1965; Nashville, Tennessee
 2–8 April 15, 1965; Nashville, Tennessee
 2–9 April 15, 1965; Nashville, Tennessee
 2–10 May 31, 1965; Nashville, Tennessee
 2–11 August 10, 1965; Nashville, Tennessee
 2–12 January 9, 1966; Nashville, Tennessee
 2–13 January 9, 1966; Nashville, Tennessee
 2–14 January 10, 1966; Nashville, Tennessee
 2–15 March 8, 1966; Nashville, Tennessee
 2–16 March 8, 1966; Nashville, Tennessee
 2–17 August 5, 1966; Los Angeles, California
 2–18 October 4, 1966; Nashville, Tennessee
 2–19 January 23, 1967; Nashville, Tennessee
 2–20 January 26, 1967; Nashville, Tennessee
 2–21 February 16, 1967; Nashville, Tennessee
 2–22 March 14, 1967; Nashville, Tennessee
 2–23 March 14, 1967; Nashville, Tennessee
 2-24 Unknown
CD-3: Recorded
 3–1 August 30, 1967; Nashville, Tennessee
 3–2 October 17, 1967; Nashville, Tennessee
 3–3 January 24, 1968; Nashville, Tennessee
 3–4 March 12, 1968; Nashville, Tennessee
 3–5 September 20, 1968; Nashville, Tennessee
 3-6 circa December 11–17, 1968; Nashville, Tennessee (unissued)
 3–7 January 10, 1969; Nashville, Tennessee (unissued)
 3–8 January 10, 1969; Nashville, Tennessee (unissued)
 3–9 May 16, 1969; Nashville, Tennessee
 3–10 May 16, 1969; Nashville, Tennessee
 3–11 May 19, 1969; Nashville, Tennessee
 3–12 May 22, 1969; Nashville, Tennessee
 3–13 June 11, 1970; Nashville, Tennessee
 3–14 June 11, 1970; Nashville, Tennessee
 3–15 June 11, 1970; Nashville, Tennessee
 3–16 June 12, 1970; Nashville, Tennessee
 3–17 June 12, 1970; Nashville, Tennessee
 3–18 November 10, 1972; Nashville, Tennessee
 3–19 June 18, 1973; Nashville, Tennessee
 3–20 November 1978; Reno, Nevada (Live at Harrah's, unissued)
 3–21 November 24, 1981; Spicewood, Texas
 3-22 1985; Nashville, Tennessee
 3-23 1985; Nashville, Tennessee
 3-24 Unknown

References

1995 albums
Roger Miller albums
Mercury Records albums
Albums produced by Jerry Kennedy